Ramona Geraldine Quimby is a fictional character in an eponymous series of novels by Beverly Cleary.  She starts out in the Henry Huggins series as the pestering younger sister of Henry's new best friend Beatrice, called "Beezus" by Ramona and her family. She was then given a larger role in the novel Beezus and Ramona and became the protagonist of her own book in Ramona the Pest.

The series concentrates on Ramona from nursery school to 4th grade, touching on social issues such as a parent losing their job, financial instability, the death of a family pet, school bullies, divorce, marriage, sibling relations and experiencing the addition of a new sibling, and more, all of which explore growing up in middle-class America.

Character overview
Ramona Quimby lives in Portland, Oregon's Grant Park neighborhood on Klickitat Street.

During her earlier appearances, Ramona was depicted as an imaginative but infuriating nursery schooler, the younger sister and best friend of Beatrice Quimby, who often insisted upon tagging along with her older sister and her friends, causing them agitation and sometimes even spoiling their fun with her imaginative mischief. She appears to be a very undisciplined young girl who gets away with terrible things she does, such as inviting her whole class to her house for a party without giving any notification to her family, or biting into many apples only once just for attention.

Ramona saw her first major role when the author decided to focus on her viewpoint more than that of other characters in the book Ramona the Pest. Here, Ramona is portrayed as an anxious, curious young girl about to start kindergarten who is in a hurry to mature, although she frequently and unintentionally manages to annoy those around her: she tugs at a classmate's curls out of curiosity and winds up being suspended from school, she disrupts naptime for her fellow pupils while striving to earn the position of "Wake-Up Fairy" for the day, and misunderstands the lyrics to the national anthem.

From then onward, the series shifts to divert focus to Ramona's point of view and years of elementary school, chronicling her experiences throughout those years. Ramona tries to behave with maturity and is in a rush to grow up, although things frequently do not go as planned and end in embarrassment for Ramona.

Throughout the series, Ramona likes car names. In Ramona the Pest she has a doll named Chevrolet (which has a very worn appearance) and her classmates laugh at her until her teacher steps in. In Ramona Forever she suggests naming her younger sibling Aston Martin.

Ramona maintains her active imagination throughout the entire series. She daydreams about earning riches and wealth for her family after her father loses his job in Ramona and her Father by starring in television commercials.  In Ramona the Brave, in first grade, she designs an intelligent-looking paper owl as a craft project that is copied by a fellow student named Susan Kushner, who receives credit and praise for her own owl, which Ramona later damages out of rage. She frequently pretends to be a rabbit in Beezus and Ramona.

Ramona became an older sister at the end of Ramona Forever to a baby girl named Roberta Day Quimby, and finally received satisfaction regarding her age towards the end of the final book in the series, Ramona's World, at her tenth birthday party. It is during the celebration that she makes amends with her rival throughout the series, Susan, after learning about her constant striving for perfection.

Ramona's age 
When Ramona first appears in the Henry Huggins books, she ranges from two through four.

She is four years old in Beezus and Ramona.

She is five years old in Henry and the Clubhouse and Ramona the Pest.

In Ramona the Brave, Ramona is six years old.

In Ramona and Her Mother and Ramona and Her Father, Ramona is seven years old.

In Ramona Quimby, Age 8 and Ramona Forever, Ramona is eight years old.

In Ramona's World, Ramona starts out nine years old, and turns ten at the end.

As Ramona grows up, her maturity greatly increases as well. At age ten, she is still very rambunctious and imaginative but is now better able to understand the perspectives of adults and friends and the needs they might have.

See also

References

External links

Ramona Quimby at the Internet Movie Database

Beverly Cleary characters
Literary characters introduced in 1950
Characters in American novels of the 20th century
Child characters in literature
Female characters in literature